United Nations Security Council Resolution 2617 was passed by a unanimous vote on 30 December 2021, which renewed  the mandate of the Counter-Terrorism Committee Executive Directorate (CTED), the expert body that supports the United Nations counter-terrorism architecture until 31 December 2025, with an interim review slated to be conducted in December 2023.

See also
 List of United Nations Security Council Resolutions 2601 to 2700 (2021–present)

References

External links 

 Text of the Resolution at undocs.org

 2617